Phaea turnbowi is a species of beetle in the family Cerambycidae. It was described by Chemsak in 1999. It is known from Panama.

References

turnbowi
Beetles described in 1999